Cassin is an unincorporated community in Bexar County, in the U.S. state of Texas. According to the Handbook of Texas, the community had a population of 50 in 1990. It is located within the Greater San Antonio metropolitan area.

History
The area in what is known as Cassin today was first settled sometime before 1900. It was named for William Cassin, a local landowner. The community served as a flag stop station for the San Antonio, Uvalde and Gulf Railroad in 1913. There was a store and a church in Cassin in the mid-1930s. Its population was 175 in 1946 and dropped to only 50 in 1990.

Geography

Education
Cassin was served by the Asa Mitchell school in the mid-1930s. Today, the community is served by the Southside Independent School District.

References

Unincorporated communities in Bexar County, Texas
Unincorporated communities in Texas
Greater San Antonio